The 1993 European Sprint Swimming Championships were held in Gateshead, United Kingdom, from 11 to 13 November. The championships were organised by the Ligue Européenne de Natation (LEN), with events held in a short course pool.

Only the 50 m individual stroke events, the 100 m individual medley and 4×50 m relay events were held at this edition. Backstroke, breaststroke and butterfly relays were held for the first time in a major international championships. Many of Europe's top swimmers did not attend the meet due to the timing of the World Short Course Championships being held less than three weeks after in Palma de Mallorca.

Medal table

Medalists

Men's events

Women's events

References

 

1993 in swimming
S
1993
Swimming in England
November 1993 sports events in the United Kingdom
International sports competitions hosted by England
International aquatics competitions hosted by the United Kingdom
Sport in Gateshead
20th century in Tyne and Wear